Valerie Heather Weiss (born 1973) is an American filmmaker and producer. She has directed and produced numerous films and founded the production company PhD Productions in 2004, which focuses on developing films rooted in science.

Early life 
Weiss was raised in Philadelphia, Pennsylvania. She attended Princeton University, where she majored in molecular biology and earned a certificate in theater and dance. She then attended Harvard University, where she earned a Ph.D. in biological chemistry and molecular pharmacology as well as a master's degree in medical sciences from Harvard Medical School. While at Harvard, she founded and was the filmmaker-in-residence and festival director of the Dudley House Film Program, the organization's film program for graduate students from 1999 to 2003. Weiss was accepted into the Catalyst Workshop at the American Film Institute, which was for scientists who wanted to develop science into movies. She had already begun to develop the idea for Losing Control, but this was the first time she ever discussed it publicly. Later she was accepted to the American Film Institute's prestigious Directing Workshop for Women, where they went through three weeks of classes and each received some funds and equipment to make a short film within one week. She made a sci-fi social satire film called Transgressions.

PhD Productions 
Weiss founded PhD Productions in 2004 with her husband, Robert Johnson. PhD Productions is an independent film company based in Hollywood, California, making films that aim to bridge science and the arts.

Personal life 
Valerie met husband Robert Johnson at Princeton as cast members in a production of Cyrano de Bergerac at Princeton University. Together, they founded PhD Productions.

Filmography 
Director

Producer

Writer

Actress

Accolades 
Valerie Weiss' second feature, A LIGHT BENEATH THEIR FEET, is lauded by Glenn Close's organization, Bring Change 2 Mind, as "heart wrenching and beautiful." The film was a special premiere at the Mill Valley Film Festival and earned the Audience Favorite, Gold Award - US Cinema Indie. After Mill Valley, A LIGHT BENEATH THEIR FEET won the Stubbornly Independent Award at the Tallgrass Film Festival, and has gone on to play at numerous film festivals including the Chicago International Film Festival, Heartland Film Festival, the Philadelphia Film Festival, and many more. A LIGHT BENEATH THEIR FEET was also awarded the prestigious EDA Award for the Best Female-Directed Narrative Feature at the 2015 Whistler Film Festival by the Alliance of Women Film Journalists.

Matt Fagerholm of RoberEbert.com writes about A LIGHT BENEATH THEIR FEET:
"In a commanding performance, Taryn Manning (Orange Is The New Black) plays Gloria, an Evanston mother wrestling with bipolar disorder and an imminent empty nest. Her dedicated daughter Beth (Madison Davenport) has a bright future ahead, but must decide if she will stay near home to care for her unpredictable mom or follow her own path. Emotionally raw and uncommonly observant, this coming-of-age drama balances the pull of family obligation against personal aspirations. By turns endearing, unsettling, and ultimately moving, A Light Beneath Their Feet is a triumph of empathetic filmmaking. There are no heroes and villains in this story, just ordinary people struggling to create a sense of normalcy in their day-to-day existence."

Critic John Anderson says in his Thompson on Hollywood Indiewire review of A LIGHT BENEATH THEIR FEET, "Not only does director Valerie Weiss's latest effort straddle several genres simultaneously—among them, the coming-of-age drama and the social critique—it also features a pair of break-out performances: Madison Davenport (Tina Fey's daughter in the upcoming "Sisters"), who plays high-schooler Beth Gerringson; and Taryn Manning ("Orange Is the New Black"), who plays Beth's mother, Gloria ... Manning, under Weiss's direction, puts a spin on Gloria that distinguishes her from similarly unstable characters."

A Light Beneath Their Feet also received a rave review from The Hollywood Reporter, calling it, "A sensitive and moving depiction of a family dealing with mental illness." "Featuring standout performances by Taryn Manning as a woman with bipolar disorder and Madison Davenport as her teenage daughter grappling with whether or not to take flight, A Light Beneath Their Feet will strike particular chords among the many who have had similar personal experiences."

Valerie's sci-fi short for her AFI Directing Workshop for Women, TRANSGRESSIONS, won a student BAFTA Award.

Valerie's first feature, LOSING CONTROL, which is loosely based on her time getting a Ph.D. at Harvard, is about a female scientist who wants proof that her boyfriend is "the one."  LOSING CONTROL was honored as the Closing Night Film at the 2011 Vail Film Festival.  LOSING CONTROL went on to win Valerie a Best Director Award from the 2011 Feel Good Film Festival, the Top Female Filmmaker Award at the 2011 Chicago Comedy Film Festival and the First Honorable Mention for the 2011 Christopher Wetzel Award for an Independent Comedy presented by Nora Dunn who later appeared in A LIGHT BENEATH THEIR FEET.

References

External links

Princeton University alumni
Harvard Medical School alumni
Film producers from Pennsylvania
1973 births
Living people
Businesspeople from Philadelphia
American women film producers
Film directors from Pennsylvania
American women film directors
American television directors
American women television directors